Sam & Mark's Big Friday Wind-Up (also called Sam & Mark's Big Wind-Up for repeat compilations featuring just the pranks and Sam & Mark's Big Christmas Wind-Up for Christmas specials) is a British children's entertainment series aired on the CBBC Channel since 16 September 2011. It is presented by Sam & Mark. It is effectively the replacement for TMi (later known as Sam & Mark's TMi Friday). A fifth series started airing from 18 December 2015, and a sixth series began airing from 16 December 2016 and finished on 31 March 2017. A seventh series began airing in January 2018.

Format
Each episode begins with Sam & Mark speaking to children in the audience who are said to have an embarrassing member of their family. They happen to bring out one of the audience member's mother/father and get them to do their embarrassing feat. They allow their children to get back at them by playing a game called 'Mum/Dad on a Wheel' which has been recently changed to 'Mum/Dad Pin Bowling'. 

Another segment is 'In Yer House' which involves Sam & Mark having to put on a disguise and play-act towards a certain child/victim without being seen, and once they are, they are 'rumbled'. There are four rounds to this game.

Episodes

Series 1 (2011)

Series 2 (2013)

Series 3 (2014)

Series 4 (2014-15)
Episode 1 was a Christmas special which aired over 1 month before the start of the main series (episodes 2 - 11)

Series 5 (2015-16)
Like the last series, episode 1 was a Christmas special which aired just under 1 month before the start of the main series (episodes 2 - 11)

Series 6 (2016-17)
Like the last two series, series 6 began with a Christmas episode in December followed by the rest of the series in January.

Series 7 (2018)
This series is the first since series 3 to not feature a Christmas special, instead there is an extra regular episode.

Series 8 (2019)
Like the last 3 series, series 8  began with a Christmas episode in December followed by the rest of the series in January.

Accolades
Sam & Mark's Big Friday Wind-Up has been nominated for 6 British Academy Children's Awards and won three. It won twice for Best Presenter in 2013 and 2015 and won Best Entertainment in 2016.

References

External links
 
 

BBC children's television shows
2010s British children's television series
2011 British television series debuts
2019 British television series endings